Georg Mühlberg (5 February 1863 – 1 January 1925) was a German painter, draftsman and illustrator.

Mühlberg illustrated especially children's literature, including fables (Hey Paul, 100 Fables for Children), fairy tales and magazines. Several images depict scenes of student life. He produced a popular postcard series on fairy tales such as The Wishing-Table and The Seven Swabians, the historical novel by Wilhelm Hauff The Piper of Hardt, and novels by E. Marlitt including The Owl House, The secret of the old maid, Gold Else, and Countess Gisela.

References
 George Miihlberg. In: Ulrich Thieme, Felix Becker among others: general lexicon of visual artists from antiquity to the present. Volume 25, EA Seemann, Leipzig, 1931, p 213
 Hans Ries: Illustration and illustrators of children's book in German-speaking 1871–1914, Osnabrück in 1992. 

German draughtsmen
German illustrators
Artists from Nuremberg
19th-century German painters
19th-century German male artists
German male painters
20th-century German painters
20th-century German male artists
1863 births
1925 deaths